Gorgasia sillneri is an eel in the family Congridae (conger/garden eels). It was described by Wolfgang Klausewitz in 1962. It is a marine, tropical eel which is known from the Gulf of Aqaba in the Red Sea, in the western Indian Ocean.

Etymology
The fish is named in honor of a German underwater photographer, Ludwig Sillner (1914–1973), who collected the holotype specimen and made important observations in the field on its ecology and life coloration.

References

sillneri
Taxa named by Wolfgang Klausewitz
Fish described in 1962